Sudur is a village and municipality in the Qusar Rayon of Azerbaijan.  It has a population of 568.  The municipality consists of the villages of Sudur, Quxur, and Yerği Kek.

References 

Populated places in Qusar District